Politechnika Metro is a station on Line M1 of the Warsaw Metro, located near the main campus of Warsaw University of Technology (Polish: Politechnika Warszawska) in Central Warsaw.

The station was opened on 7 April 1995 as the northern terminus of the inaugural stretch of the Warsaw Metro, between Kabaty and Politechnika. On 26 May 1998 the line was extended north to Centrum.

See also 
Plac Konstytucji: a planned station north of this station.
Zebra Tower, adjoins the station

References

External links

Railway stations in Poland opened in 1995
Line 1 (Warsaw Metro) stations
Śródmieście, Warsaw